True Grit is a 2010 American Western film directed by the Coen brothers. It is the second adaptation of Charles Portis' 1968 novel of the same name, which was previously released in 1969 featuring John Wayne. The 2010 version stars Jeff Bridges, Hailee Steinfeld and Matt Damon. It was released by Paramount Pictures in the United States and Canada on December 22, 2010, grossing over USD $25.6 million at the box office, twice its pre-release projections, in its opening weekend. Since then it has made over USD $171 million domestically and USD $249 million worldwide. The film was well received by movie critics, with an approval rating of 96 percent on the review aggregator Rotten Tomatoes. It has appeared in more than a dozen movie reviewers' Top Ten lists for the best movies of the year.

True Grit has received honors in different categories, ranging from recognition of the movie itself, to its direction, art direction, cinematography, score and writing, as well as for performances by the cast, mainly Bridges for Best Actor and Steinfeld for Best Supporting Actress. The Coen's work on True Grit'''s screenplay scored them a nomination from the Writers Guild of America, but lost to Aaron Sorkin for The Social Network. Deakins' work on True Grits cinematography earned him more than ten nominations, including an award from the Boston Society of Film Critics. The Cinema Audio Society Awards presented Peter F. Kurland, Skip Lievsay, Craig Berkey and Greg Orloff their Outstanding Achievement in Sound Mixing for Motion Pictures honor in 2011.

The 83rd Academy Awards nominated the movie for ten of its accolades, but True Grit failed to win any awards. Among the nominations were Best Picture, Best Adapted Screenplay, Best Actor (giving Bridges his sixth nomination), Best Supporting Actress and Best Art Direction. Fourteen-year-old Steinfeld is the 73rd actor to be nominated for an Academy Award for their debut screen performance in the award show's 83-year history. The Broadcast Film Critics Association Awards nominated True Grit in eleven categories, including Best Makeup. They also awarded Steinfeld their best youth accolade. At the 64th British Academy Film Awards (BAFTAs) ceremony, True Grit'' earned eight nominations, including one win for Roger Deakins' cinematography. Unlike other critics' awards, the BAFTAs nominated Steinfeld for Best Actress. Steinfeld was named Best Supporting Actress by multiple critics awards and groups, such as the Toronto Film Critics Association Awards. Her performance has also earned her a breakthrough award nomination  from the viewer-voted 2011 MTV Movie Awards.

Awards and nominations 

: Paramount Pictures (production company), A.C. Lyles, Steven Spielberg, Paul Schwake (executive producers), Ethan and Joel Coen, Scott Ruben (producers, directors and writers), Jeff Bridges, Josh Brolin, Matt Damon and Hailee Steinfeld (actors)

See also 
 2010 in film
 Movies

References 
 General

 

 Specific

External links
 

Lists of accolades by film